This is a list of notable Sri Lankan sweets and desserts. Sri Lanka is well known throughout South Asia for sweets and desserts originating from there. Desserts are usually served as part of main meals, whereas sweets are consumed at tea times. 
Many Sri Lankan desserts and sweets contain domestic spices, jaggery and kithul (Caryota urens) treacle. Locally made treacle and jaggery are the most common sweeteners.

Desserts

Sweets
Commonly used ingredients across traditional Sri Lankan sweets are Rice flour, treacle and moconut milk. Treacle is a food sweetening syrup made from the sap oozing from "tapped" blossoms of palm trees, particularly, Coconut (Cocos nusifera) or "Kithul" (Caryota urens).

See also
 Sri Lankan cuisine
 List of desserts

Sri Lankan sweets
 
Desserts